Sonidegib (INN), sold under the brand name Odomzo, is a medication used to treat cancer.

Sonidegib is Hedgehog signaling pathway inhibitor (via smoothened antagonism).

Approvals and indications
It was approved for medical use in the United States and in the European Union in 2015

It is indicated for the treatment of adults with locally advanced basal-cell carcinoma that has recurred following surgery or radiation therapy, or those who are not candidates for surgery or radiation therapy.

Pharmacology 
Sonidegib is administered by mouth. Common side effects include muscle spasms, hair loss, fatigue, abdominal pain, nausea, headache, and weight loss.

Sonidegib binds to and inhibits smoothened to inhibit activation of the Hedgehog pathway. Sonidegib is primarily metabolized by CYP3A and is eliminated hepatically.

Development
It has been investigated as a potential treatment for:
 Pancreatic cancer
 Breast cancer
 Basal cell carcinoma of the skin
 Small cell lung cancer
 Medulloblastoma
 Advanced solid tumors (including ovarian, breast, pancreatic, stomach, oesophageal cancers and glioblastoma multiforme)
 Acute leukemia and chronic myeloid leukemia
 Myelofibrosis and essential thrombocythaemia

It has demonstrated significant efficacy against melanoma in vitro and in vivo. It also demonstrated efficacy in a mouse model of pancreatic cancer.

References

External links
 
 

Benzamides
Morpholines
Aminopyridines
Novartis brands
Trifluoromethyl ethers
Teratogens
Antineoplastic drugs